GLK may refer to:

Places
 Abdullahi Yusuf Airport, serving Galkayo, Somalia
 Gay and Lesbian Kingdom of the Coral Sea Islands, a micronation established as a symbolic political protest by a group of gay rights activists based in Australia

People
 The Gaslamp Killer (born 1982), American record producer

Others
 Glk (software), a portable API for text interfaces
 Gilaki language (ISO 639-3: glk), a Caspian language, and a member of the northwestern Iranian language branch, spoken in Iran's Gilan Province
 Glucokinase, an enzyme that facilitates phosphorylation of glucose to glucose-6-phosphate. 
 Mercedes-Benz GLK-Class, a German sport utility vehicle